Mirror of Madness is the second full-length studio album by the Finnish melodic death metal band Norther, released on 12 July 2003 by Spinefarm Records. Mirror of Madness features a cover song, "Smash" by punk rock band The Offspring. It also includes the "Mirror of Madness" video but only in the U.S. The bonus tracks, "Frozen Sky" and "Smash" covers, are only for the Japanese version of the album.

The song "Unleash Hell" was released as a single.

Track listing

Credits

Band members
 Petri Lindroos − Guitars, Vocals
 Kristian Ranta − Guitars
 Tuomas Planman − Keyboards
 Jukka Koskinen − Bass
 Toni Hallio − Drums

Production and other
 Mixed in January 2003 at Finnvox Studios by Mikko Karmila and mastered by Mika Jussila

References

2003 albums
Norther albums